"Everyday" is a song by American rock band Bon Jovi. It was released on August 19, 2002, as the lead single from the band's eighth studio album, Bounce (2002). The song was written and produced by Jon Bon Jovi, Richie Sambora and Andreas Carlsson. "Everyday" was nominated at the 2003 Grammy Awards for Best Pop Performance by a Duo or Group with Vocal.

Background
 Speaking in a video interview, Jon claims, "We went after something that was a little more aggressive than (what) we had done before, but still had a big chorus, and had something to say". In reference to the song, Richie Sambora added, "Time is the most precious thing that you have, so you should try to live every moment to the fullest".

"Everyday" was later featured on the band's This Left Feels Right album in an acoustic style. In Asia, this song was used as the background for Mitsubishi TV adverts throughout 2002 and 2003.

Commercial performance
"Everyday" peaked at  1 in Canada and Spain and reached the top 10 in several other countries, including the United Kingdom (No. 5), Australia (No. 5), Switzerland (No. 6), Sweden (No. 6), Italy (No. 7), and Germany (No. 7). In the United States, the song reached No. 36 on the Billboard Adult Top 40 chart and No. 31 on the Billboard Mainstream Rock Tracks chart.

Music video
The music video shows the band performing in Socorro, New Mexico, by the VLA Radio Telescopes, one of the world's largest astronomical radio observatories. Meanwhile, different cities around the world are "hit" by numerous red TV boxes (Bon Jovi appears on the screens as the huge telescopes send out the signal all over the world). The people from these cities seem to be bored, but as soon they watch the TVs, they "start having fun".

Important scenes:
 At London, England, two punks chill out in front of the Big Ben.
 Wild savannah in Africa: tribe members jump a skip rope.
 Agra, India: youths skate aside the Taj Mahal.
 Havana, Cuba: a girl plays baseball with friends in the middle of the street.
 Moscow, Russia: TV boxes fall nearby the Saint Basil's Cathedral.
 New York City, USA: a girl walks and jumps through the window of a taxi at Times Square.
 Parkes radio telescope, Australia: Australian Aborigines dancing around a bonfire.
 Sarajevo, Bosnia and Herzegovina: people flies paper planes over a soccer stadium.
 Some border of Israel: a soldier guards the entrance of vehicles.
 Tokyo, Japan: Harajuku girls play with a hologram of a Pikachu-esque figure in a Tokyo street.
 Rome, Italy: a couple kisses in front the Colosseum.

Track listings
CD1:
 "Everyday" – 2:59
 "Lucky" – 3:47
 "No Regrets" – 4:02
 "Standing" – 3:50

CD2:
 "Everyday" 2:59
 "Another Reason to Believe" (demo) – 3:30
 "Breathe" (demo) – 3:40
 "We Can Dance" (demo) – 4:45

Charts

Weekly charts

Year-end charts

Release history

In popular culture
"Everyday" is featured on the Madden NFL 2003 soundtrack. An uptempo eurodance remix of "Everyday" was recorded in 2002 by Wine, appearing on Dancemania Speed 10.

References

External links
 BonJovi.com

Bon Jovi songs
2002 singles
Canadian Singles Chart number-one singles
Island Records singles
Mercury Records singles
Number-one singles in Spain
Songs written by Andreas Carlsson
Songs written by Jon Bon Jovi
Songs written by Richie Sambora